Doratomyces (Dor-ah-toe-mice’-ees) is a genus of the fungi imperfecti, closely related to Scopulariopsis.  Their conidiophores gather together to form a stalk-like inflorescence known as a synnema or coremia; Scopulariopsis being distinguished in their lack of such a structure.

Usually associated with decay, they are usually found in association with dead wood, rotting plants, and in soil or dung.  Economically, they can cause rot in potatoes, oats and corn.

References

Microascales